Gaetano Manno (born 26 July 1982) is a German former professional footballer who played as a midfielder. Manno holds both German and Italian citizenship.

Career
Manno was born in Hagen. At the end of the winter break of the 2013–14 season, he left 3. Liga side Preußen Münster in spite of having signed a long-term contract just the summer before. He joined fourth tier Regionalliga West club Viktoria Köln on a two-and-a-half-year deal until 2016. Köln paid a transfer fee to Münster.

In May 2018 it was announced, that Gaetano had got his contract with Wuppertaler SV extended with one year and from the new season would function as a playing assistant manager.

Personal life
On 20 May 2019, it was confirmed, that Manno would join lower-league side SpVg Hagen 11 from the 2019–20 season.

References

External links
 
 

1982 births
Living people
German footballers
Italian footballers
TSG Sprockhövel players
VfL Bochum II players
VfL Bochum players
Wuppertaler SV players
VfL Osnabrück players
SC Paderborn 07 players
FC Rot-Weiß Erfurt players
SC Preußen Münster players
FC Viktoria Köln players
Bundesliga players
2. Bundesliga players
3. Liga players
Regionalliga players
Association football forwards
Sportspeople from Hagen
Footballers from North Rhine-Westphalia